Ash Gut is a  long 2nd order tributary to the Murderkill River in Kent County, Delaware.

Course
Ash Gut rises on the Pratt Branch divide about 0.2 miles west of Frederica, Delaware.  Ash Gut then flows southeast to meet the Murderkill River about 0.5 miles south of Frederica, Delaware.

Watershed
Ash Gut drains  of area, receives about 45.1 in/year of precipitation, has a topographic wetness index of 586.46 and is about 4.2% forested.

See also
List of Delaware rivers

Maps

References

Rivers of Delaware
Rivers of Kent County, Delaware
Tributaries of the Murderkill River